The following outline is provided as an overview of and topical guide to Cameroon:

The Republic of Cameroon is a unitary republic located in Middle Africa. The country is called "Africa in miniature" for its geological and cultural diversity. Natural features include beaches, deserts, mountains, rainforests, and savannas. Cameroon is home to over 200 different ethnic and linguistic groups.

General reference

 Pronunciation:
 Common English country name:  Cameroon
 Official English country name:  The Republic of Cameroon
 Common endonym(s): Cameroun  
 Official endonym(s): République du Cameroun  
 Adjectival(s): Cameroonian
 Demonym(s):
 International rankings of Cameroon
 ISO country codes: CM, CMR, 120
 ISO region codes: See ISO 3166-2:CM
 Internet country code top-level domain: .cm

Geography of Cameroon 

Geography of Cameroon
 Cameroon is: a country
 Location:
 Northern Hemisphere and Eastern Hemisphere
 Africa
 Middle Africa
 West Africa
 Time zone:  West Africa Time (UTC+01)
 Extreme points of Cameroon
 High:  Fako on Mount Cameroon 
 Low:  Bight of Bonny 0 m
 Land boundaries:  4,591 km
 1,690 km
 1,094 km
 797 km
 523 km
 298 km
 189 km
 Coastline:  Gulf of Guinea 402 km
 Population of Cameroon: 17,795,000(2005) – 58th most populous country

 Area of Cameroon:  – 53rd largest country
 Atlas of Cameroon

Environment of Cameroon 

 Climate of Cameroon
 Ecoregions in Cameroon
 Protected areas of Cameroon
 Biosphere reserves in Cameroon
 National parks of Cameroon
 Wildlife of Cameroon
 Fauna of Cameroon
 Birds of Cameroon
 Insects of Cameroon
 Butterflies of Cameroon
 Mammals of Cameroon
 Moths of Cameroon
 Non-marine molluscs of Cameroon

Natural geographic features of Cameroon 

 Glaciers in Cameroon: none
 Mountains of Cameroon
 Volcanoes in Cameroon
 Rivers of Cameroon
 World Heritage Sites in Cameroon

Geographical regions of Cameroon

Ecoregions of Cameroon 

List of ecoregions in Cameroon

Administrative divisions of Cameroon 

Subdivisions of Cameroon
 Regions of Cameroon (formerly named "Provinces")
 Departments of Cameroon
 Communes of Cameroon

Regions of Cameroon 
Regions of Cameroon
 Adamawa
 Centre
 East
 Far North
 Littoral
 North
 Northwest
 South
 Southwest
 West

Departments of Cameroon 
Departments of Cameroon – the Regions of Cameroon are divided into 58 divisions or departments (départements)

Communes of Cameroon 
Communes of Cameroon – municipalities
Municipalities of Cameroon
 Capital of Cameroon: Yaoundé

Demography of Cameroon 

Demographics of Cameroon

Government and politics of Cameroon 

Politics of Cameroon
 Form of government: unitary presidential republic
 Capital of Cameroon: Yaoundé
 Economic crisis of Cameroon
 Elections in Cameroon
 Political parties in Cameroon

Branches of government

Government of Cameroon

Executive branch of the government of Cameroon 
 Head of state: President of Cameroon
 List of heads of state of Cameroon
 List of first ladies of Cameroon
 Vice President of Cameroon
 Head of government: Prime Minister of Cameroon
 List of heads of government of Cameroon
 Ministries of Cameroon
 Ministry of Arts and Culture
 National Archives of Cameroon
 Ministry of Basic Education
 Ministry of Commerce
 Ministry of Communication
 Ministry of Defense
 Ministry of Finance
 Ministry of Employment and Vocational Training
 Ministry of Energy and Water Resources
 Ministry of Environment and Nature Protection in Cameroon
 Ministry of External Relations
 Ministry of Forestry and Wildlife
 Ministry of Industry, Mines and Technological Development
 Ministry of Justice of Cameroon
 Ministry of Labor and Social Security
 Ministry of Livestock Fisheries and Animal Industries
 Ministry of Economy, Planning and Regional Development
 Ministry of Posts and Telecommunications
 Ministry of Public Health
 Ministry of Public Service and Administrative Reforms
 Ministry of Public Works
 Ministry of Scientific Research and Innovation
 Ministry of Secondary and Superior Education
 Ministry of Secondary Education
 Ministry of Small and Medium-sized Enterprises, Social Economy and Handicrafts
 Ministry of Sports and Physical Education
 Ministry of Territorial Administration
 Ministry of Decentralization and Local Development
 Ministry of Tourism
 Ministry of Transport
 Ministry of Housing and Urban Development
 Ministry of Women's Empowerment and the Family
 Ministry of Youth Affairs and Civic Education
 Ministry Under the Presidency of the Republic

Legislative branch of the government of Cameroon 

 National Assembly of Cameroon (unicameral)
 List of presidents of the National Assembly of Cameroon

Judicial branch of the government of Cameroon 

Court system of Cameroon
 Supreme Court of Cameroon
 High Court of Justice of Cameroon
 Court of Appeal of Cameroon

Foreign relations of Cameroon 

Foreign relations of Cameroon
 Diplomatic missions in Cameroon
 Diplomatic missions of Cameroon

International organization membership 
The Republic of Cameroon is a member of:

African, Caribbean, and Pacific Group of States (ACP)
African Development Bank Group (AfDB)
African Union (AU)
Commonwealth of Nations
Conference des Ministres des Finances des Pays de la Zone Franc (FZ)
Development Bank of Central African States (BDEAC)
Economic and Monetary Community of Central Africa (CEMAC)
Food and Agriculture Organization (FAO)
Group of 77 (G77)
International Atomic Energy Agency (IAEA)
International Bank for Reconstruction and Development (IBRD)
International Chamber of Commerce (ICC)
International Civil Aviation Organization (ICAO)
International Criminal Court (ICCt) (signatory)
International Criminal Police Organization (Interpol)
International Development Association (IDA)
International Federation of Red Cross and Red Crescent Societies (IFRCS)
International Finance Corporation (IFC)
International Fund for Agricultural Development (IFAD)
International Labour Organization (ILO)
International Maritime Organization (IMO)
International Mobile Satellite Organization (IMSO)
International Monetary Fund (IMF)
International Olympic Committee (IOC)
International Organization for Migration (IOM)
International Organization for Standardization (ISO) (correspondent)

International Red Cross and Red Crescent Movement (ICRM)
International Telecommunication Union (ITU)
International Telecommunications Satellite Organization (ITSO)
International Trade Union Confederation (ITUC)
Inter-Parliamentary Union (IPU)
Islamic Development Bank (IDB)
Multilateral Investment Guarantee Agency (MIGA)
Nonaligned Movement (NAM)
Organisation internationale de la Francophonie (OIF)
Organisation of Islamic Cooperation (OIC)
Organisation for the Prohibition of Chemical Weapons (OPCW)
Permanent Court of Arbitration (PCA)
United Nations (UN)
United Nations Conference on Trade and Development (UNCTAD)
United Nations Educational, Scientific, and Cultural Organization (UNESCO)
United Nations Industrial Development Organization (UNIDO)
Universal Postal Union (UPU)
World Confederation of Labour (WCL)
World Customs Organization (WCO)
World Federation of Trade Unions (WFTU)
World Health Organization (WHO)
World Intellectual Property Organization (WIPO)
World Meteorological Organization (WMO)
World Tourism Organization (UNWTO)
World Trade Organization (WTO)

Law and order in Cameroon 

Law of Cameroon
 Constitution of Cameroon
 Crime in Cameroon
 Human trafficking in Cameroon
 Prostitution in Cameroon
 Human rights in Cameroon
 LGBT rights in Cameroon
 Freedom of religion in Cameroon
 Polygamy in Cameroon – it's legal
 Law enforcement in Cameroon

Military of Cameroon 

Military of Cameroon
 Command
 Commander-in-chief:
 Forces
 Army of Cameroon
 Navy of Cameroon
 Air Force of Cameroon

Local government in Cameroon 

Local government in Cameroon
 Regional Council (Cameroon)

History of Cameroon 

History of Cameroon
Current events of Cameroon
 History of Cameroon by period
 Reunification of Cameroon
 History of Cameroon by region
 History of Cameroon by subject
 History of rail transport in Cameroon

Culture of Cameroon 

Culture of Cameroon
 Architecture of Cameroon
 Musgum mud huts
 Cuisine of Cameroon
 Languages of Cameroon
 General Alphabet of Cameroon Languages
 Museums in Cameroon
 National symbols of Cameroon
 Coat of arms of Cameroon
 Flag of Cameroon
 National anthem of Cameroon
 People of Cameroon
 Ethnic groups in Cameroon
 Chinese people in Cameroon
 List of Cameroonians
 Prostitution in Cameroon
 Public holidays in Cameroon
 Scouting and Guiding in Cameroon
 World Heritage Sites in Cameroon

Art in Cameroon 
Art in Cameroon
 List of Cameroonian artists
 Cinema of Cameroon
 List of Cameroonian films
 Dance in Cameroon
 Literature of Cameroon
 Music of Cameroon

Religion in Cameroon 

Religion in Cameroon
 Cathedrals in Cameroon
 Freedom of religion in Cameroon
 Religions in Cameroon
 Bahá'í Faith in Cameroon
 Christianity in Cameroon
 Evangelical Church of Cameroon
 Evangelical Lutheran Church of Cameroon
 National Episcopal Conference of Cameroon
 Orthodox Presbyterian Church in Cameroon
 Presbyterian Church in Cameroon
 Roman Catholicism in Cameroon
 List of Roman Catholic dioceses in Cameroon
 Hinduism in Cameroon
 Islam in Cameroon

Sports in Cameroon 

Sport in Cameroon
 Football in Cameroon
 Football clubs in Cameroon
 Cameroon at the Olympics
 Rugby union in Cameroon

Economy and infrastructure of Cameroon 

Economy of Cameroon
 Economic rank, by nominal GDP (2007): 92nd (ninety-second)
 Agriculture in Cameroon
 Banking in Cameroon
 Banks in Cameroon
 Union Bank of Cameroon
 Communications in Cameroon
 Media of Cameroon
 Postal service in Cameroon
 Postage stamps and postal history of Cameroon
 Telecommunications in Cameroon
 Telephone numbers in Cameroon
 Internet in Cameroon
 Companies of Cameroon
Currency of Cameroon: Franc
ISO 4217: XAF
 Economic crisis of Cameroon
 Energy in Cameroon
 Power stations in Cameroon
 Privatization of the electricity sector in Cameroon
 Health care in Cameroon
 Hospitals in Cameroon
 Mining in Cameroon
 Spatial Development in Cameroon
 Tourism in Cameroon
 Trade unions in Cameroon
 Confederation of Cameroon Trade Unions
 Union of Free Trade Unions of Cameroon
 Transport in Cameroon
 Air transport in Cameroon
 Airports in Cameroon
 Rail transport in Cameroon
 History of rail transport in Cameroon
 Railway stations in Cameroon

Education in Cameroon 

Education in Cameroon
 National Library of Cameroon
 Universities in Cameroon
 American Institute of Cameroon, Ndop 
 International University, Bamenda
 University of Buea
 University of Bamenda
 University of Douala
 University of Dschang
 University of Ngaoundere
 Universite des Montagnes (Highlands University)
 University of Maroua
 University of Yaounde (two campuses)
 The International Relations Institute of Cameroon – IRIC (yaounde)
 Siantou and Ndi Samba Schools of Higher Learning (Yaounde)
 Catholic University of Cameroon, Bamenda (Bamenda)

Health in Cameroon 

Health in Cameroon

See also 

Cameroon

Index of Cameroon-related articles
List of Cameroon-related topics
List of international rankings
Member state of the Commonwealth of Nations
Member state of the United Nations
Outline of Africa
Outline of geography
 Beba Village Community in Cameroon
 Catholic University of Cameroon, Bamenda
 Embassy of Cameroon, Washington, D.C.
 International Relations Institute of Cameroon
 Union of the Peoples of Cameroon
 List of municipalities of Cameroon

References

External links

Presidency of the Republic of Cameroon
Prime Minister's Office
National Assembly of Cameroon
CRTV – Cameroon Radio Television

Cameroon